TAT-2 was AT&T Corporation's second transatlantic telephone cable. It was in operation from 1959 to 1982, initially carrying 48 telephone circuits on two cables between Penmarch, France and Clarenville, Newfoundland.  It was operated by AT&T and the national operators of Germany and France.

References 
Film on the construction of the cable system AT&T Archives: Cable to the Continent, a 1959 film about the second transatlantic telephone cable

Infrastructure completed in 1959
Transatlantic communications cables
Canada–France relations
1959 establishments in France
1959 establishments in Newfoundland and Labrador
1982 disestablishments in France
1982 disestablishments in Newfoundland and Labrador